Andrew O'Connor (June 7, 1874 – June 9, 1941) was an American-Irish sculptor whose work is represented in museums in America, Ireland, Britain and France.

Life
O'Connor was born in Worcester, Massachusetts and died in Dublin, Ireland.  For a time he was in the London studio of the painter, John Singer Sargent, and later worked for the architects, McKim, Mead and White in America and with the sculptor Daniel Chester French. Settling in Paris in the early years of the 20th century, he exhibited annually at the Paris Salon. In 1906 he was the first foreign sculptor to win the Second Class medal for his statue of General Henry Ware Lawton, now in Garfield Park in Indianapolis. In 1928 he achieved a similar distinction by being awarded the Gold Medal for his Tristan and Iseult, a marble group now in the Brooklyn Museum. His work was also part of the sculpture event in the art competition at the 1928 Summer Olympics.

A number of his plaster casts are in the Hugh Lane Municipal Gallery, Dublin and there are works in Tate Britain, the Walters Art Museum, Baltimore, the Corcoran Gallery of Art, the Metropolitan Museum of Art and the Musée d'Art Moderne, Paris.

O'Connor was involved in a minor controversy in 1909 when he was commissioned to design a statue for Commodore John Barry, of the American Revolutionary-era navy. O'Connor's first design was heatedly attacked by Irish-American groups. He submitted a second version, but it too was ultimately rejected, and the sculptor John J. Boyle received the commission.

Selected works
Vanderbilt Memorial Doors, St Bartholomew's Church, Manhattan, New York City, 1901–03
General Henry Ware Lawton, Garfield Park, Indianapolis, Indiana, 1906
Statue of Lew Wallace, National Statuary Hall Collection, U.S. Capitol, Washington, D.C., 1910
Governor John Albert Johnson, Minnesota State Capitol, St. Paul, 1912
1898 Soldier, Spanish–American War Memorial, Wheaton Square, Worcester, Massachusetts, 1917. The model for O'Connor's statue was his student, Vincent Schofield Wickham.
Abraham Lincoln, Illinois State Capitol, Springfield, 1918 
The Victims, Merrion Square, Dublin, Ireland,  1923, (dedicated 1947). Intended for a World War I Memorial in Washington, D.C. (abandoned), it depicts a kneeling wife and a standing mother mourning a dead soldier.
A copy of Kneeling Wife ( 1923) is at the Tate Britain.
Lafayette Monument, Mount Vernon Place, Baltimore, Maryland, 1924
Christ the King, Dún Laoghaire, Ireland, 1926
Tristan and Iseult, Brooklyn Museum, Brooklyn, New York City, 1928
Bust of Abraham Lincoln, Royal Exchange, London, United Kingdom, 1930
Seated Abraham Lincoln, Fort Lincoln Cemetery, Brentwood, Maryland, 1931 (dedicated 1947). The statue was commissioned for the Rhode Island Statehouse, but the project was abandoned during the Depression.

References

Irish sculptors
20th-century Irish sculptors
20th-century American male artists
19th-century Irish sculptors
Male sculptors
1874 births
1941 deaths
Artists from Worcester, Massachusetts
20th-century American sculptors
19th-century American sculptors
American male sculptors
Sculptors from Massachusetts
19th-century American male artists
Olympic competitors in art competitions
American expatriates in France
American emigrants to Ireland